Leonardo de la Caridad Padura Fuentes (born October 10, 1955) is a Cuban novelist and journalist.  , he is one of Cuba's best-known writers internationally.  In his native Spanish, as well as in English and some other languages, he is often referred to by the shorter form of his name, Leonardo Padura. He has written screenplays, two books of short stories, and a series of detective novels translated into 10 languages. In 2012, Padura was awarded the National Prize for Literature, Cuba's national literary award and the most important award of its kind. In 2015, he was awarded the Premio Principe de Asturias de las Letras of Spain, one of the most important literary prizes in the Spanish-speaking world and usually considered as the Iberoamerican Nobel Prize.

Life and career 
Padura, who was born in Havana, took a degree in Latin American literature at the University of Havana. In 1980 he first came to prominence as an investigative journalist in a literary magazine called Caimán Barbudo, a well-established publication that is still published today. He became known as an essayist and a writer of screenplays and in particular, detective novels. 
  
He wrote his first short novel between 1983 and 1984. Titled Fiebre de caballos (Horse Fever), it was basically a love story. During the next six years, he continued to work as a journalist, reporting on a wide range of cultural and historical topics. However, around this time he began to write his first novel featuring police officer Mario Conde. While he was writing it, Padura realised how fundamental his years as a journalist were to his development as a writer. Firstly it gave him a whole new experience of the country, and secondly, it changed his style with respect to his first book.

In 2013, France named him a Chevalier of the Ordre des Arts et des Lettres.

Padura still lives and writes in his native city of Havana.
"In one of his essays entitled 'I would like to be Paul Auster,' Padura complains that he would love not to be constantly asked about politics in his country and why he continues living there. But this is very much his niche: he is widely seen as the best writer in Cuba, a country whose best writers were all formed before Castro rule. He offers us an off-the-beaten-path visit of a relatively closed society, a prose that is free of propaganda (though not liberated from surveillance). By occupying a small but significant critical space in Cuba, Padura becomes more interesting for Cuba observers and more intriguing for students of cultural and literary trends in the island."

Mario Conde books
Padura is best known in the English-speaking world for his quartet of detective novels featuring lieutenant Mario Conde. Collectively titled Las cuatro estaciones (The four seasons), they are sometimes called The Havana Quartet in their English translations. Conde is a cop who would rather be a writer, and admits to feelings of "solidarity with writers, crazy people, and drunkards". These books are set respectively in winter, spring, summer and autumn (Vientos de cuaresma literally means "Lenten Winds" and Paisaje de otoño, "Autumn landscape"):
Pasado perfecto (1991, translated as Havana Blue, 2007)
Vientos de cuaresma (1994, translated as Havana Gold, 2008)
Máscaras (1997, translated as Havana Red, 2005)
Paisaje de otoño (1998, translated as Havana Black, 2006)

Padura has published five subsequent books featuring Conde, the novella Adiós Hemingway, La neblina del ayer (The Fog of Yesterday, published in English as Havana Fever)., La Cola de la Serpiente (Grab a Snake by the Tail), Herejes (Heretics) and La Transparencia del Tiempo (The Transparency of Time). Adiós Hemingway was Padura's first book to be translated into English, in 2005. The Havana-Cultura website comments on the similarities and differences between Padura and Hemingway, and how they might explain Padura's decision to feature the expatriate American in Adiós Hemingway.

Paisaje de otoño won the 1998 Premio Hammett of the Asociación Internacional de Escritores Policiacos (International Association of Crime Writers). This prize should not be confused with the similarly named Hammett Prize given by the North American branch of the organization, which is restricted to United States and Canadian authors.

The four books were adapted as four Spanish language television films, which have been released in a group with English subtitles as the Netflix mini-series Four Seasons in Havana. They star Cuban actor Jorge Perugorría and were produced by Tornasol Film.

An English-language remake named Havana Quartet was considered by Starz, with Antonio Banderas tagged to act as Conde, but it did not proceed beyond the development stage. In 2014, BBC Radio broadcast dramatizations of the four stories starring Zubin Varla.

Other works
Padura's historical novel El hombre que amaba a los perros (The Man Who Loved Dogs) deals with the 1940 murder of exiled Russian revolutionary Leon Trotsky, and the man who assassinated him, Ramon Mercader. At almost 600 pages, it is perhaps Padura's most ambitious and accomplished work and the result of more than five years of meticulous historical research. The novel, published in September 2009, attracted publicity mainly because of its political theme. The novel centres "on Stalin’s murderous obsession with Leon Trotsky, an intellectual architect of the Russian Revolution and the founder of the Red Army", and considers "how revolutionary utopias devolve into totalitarian dystopias."

Padura's books are also available in French (including all the books featuring Conde), Italian, Portuguese, German, Greek, and Danish.

Bibliography

Books

 Pasado perfecto, 1991 ("Havana Blue", 2007).
 Máscaras, 1997 ("Havana Red", 2005).
 Paisaje de otoño, 1998 ("Havana Black", 2006). 
 Vientos de cuaresma, 2001 ("Havana Gold", 2008).
 La novela de mi vida, 2002.
 Adiós Hemingway, 2005.
 La neblina del ayer, 2005 ("Havana Fever", 2009).
 El hombre que amaba a los perros, 2009 (The Man Who Loved Dogs, 2014).
 La cola de la serpiente, 2011.
"Regreso a Ítaca" (Return to Itaca, 2016)
 Herejes, 2013 ("Heretics", 2017).
La transparencia del tiempo, 2018.
Como polvo en el viento ("Like Dust in the Wind, 2020)
 Personas decentes, 2022.

Critical studies and reviews of Padura's work

 "How to Write from Mantilla, or the Small Heresies of Leonardo Padura," chapter 5 in Yvon Grenier, Culture and the Cuban State, Participation, Recognition, and Dissonance under Communism (Lexington Books, 2017).

References

Further reading
Uxo, Carlos, ed. (2006). The Detective Fiction of Leonardo Padura Fuentes. Manchester: Manchester Metropolitan University Press. . Articles in English and Spanish. 
Wilkinson, Stephen (2006).  Detective Fiction in Cuban Society and Culture. Oxford & Berne: Peter Lang.   (US 0-8204-7963-2).  This book contains four chapters on Padura and a history of the Cuban detective genre.
González, Eduardo, (2006). Cuba and the Tempest: Literature and Cinema in the Time of Diaspora.  The University of North Carolina Press. .  The long last section of this book is dedicated to Padura's four novels: Las cuatro estaciones, under the title: "1989: The Year that Never Was."

External links

Interview with Padura in Shots ezine
 Interview with Leonardo Padura on Havana-Cultura
"Perspectivismo y ficción en La novela de mi vida: la historia como versión de sí misma" Artículo de Sonia Behar en Memoria histórica, Género e Interdisciplinariedad: Los Estudios Culturales Hispánicos en el siglo XXI. Eds. Santiago Juan-Navarro y Joan Torres-Pou. Madrid: Biblioteca Nueva, 2007.
Interview about Cuba and crisis in Ukraine and Venezuela

1955 births
Cuban male novelists
Cuban screenwriters
Male screenwriters
Cuban television writers
Crime fiction writers
Cuban crime fiction writers
Living people
Cuban journalists
Male journalists
Cuban essayists
Male essayists
Prix Roger Caillois recipients
Naturalised citizens of Spain
Male television writers
Cuban emigrants to Spain